New Salem Township may refer to the following townships in the United States:

 New Salem Township, McDonough County, Illinois
 New Salem Township, Pike County, Illinois
 New Salem Township, Union County, North Carolina